Apsara is a 1966 Cambodian romantic drama film edited, written, and directed by Norodom Sihanouk, who was Cambodia's Chief of State and former King. It stars Nhiek Tioulong, Saksi Sbong, Princess Norodom Buppha Devi, and Prince Sisowath Chivan Monirak.

Apsara is Sihanouk's first feature-length film, as well as his first film in colour. He made the film in part to counter the negative portrayal of Cambodia he saw in the 1965 British-American film Lord Jim. The film premiered at the LUX Theater in Phnom Penh on 20 August 1966.

Cast
Nhiek Tioulong as General Rithi
Saksi Sbong as Rattana
Norodom Buppha Devi as Kantha, a dancer
Sisowath Chivan Monirak as Lieutenant Phaly, a pilot
Norodom Narindrapong as Narin, brother of Phaly
Norodom Phurissara
Sinn Sisamouth as Singer
Sieng Dy as Singer
Suy
Mandoline

References

External links

1966 films
1966 romantic drama films
Cambodian drama films
Khmer-language films